Sharakan may refer to:

Armenian chant (Armenian: շարական, pronounced sharakan), liturgical sacred songs used during Holy Mass of the Armenian Apostolic Church
Sharakan, alternative name of Shorkan, village in Sirvan Rural District, Nowsud District, Paveh County, Kermanshah Province, Iran